Big History is an academic discipline which examines history from the Big Bang to the present. Big History resists specialization, and searches for universal patterns or trends. It examines long time frames using a multidisciplinary approach based on combining numerous disciplines from science and the humanities, and explores human existence in the context of this bigger picture. It integrates studies of the cosmos, Earth, life, and humanity using empirical evidence to explore cause-and-effect relations, and is taught at universities and primary and secondary schools often using web-based interactive presentations.

Historian David Christian has been credited with coining the term "Big History" while teaching one of the first such courses at Macquarie University. An all-encompassing study of humanity's relationship to cosmology and natural history has been pursued by scholars since the Renaissance, and the new field, Big History, continues such work.

Comparison with conventional history

Big History examines the past using numerous time scales, from the Big Bang to modernity, unlike conventional history courses which typically begin with the introduction of farming and civilization, or with the beginning of written records. It explores common themes and patterns. Courses generally do not focus on humans until one-third to halfway through, and, unlike conventional history courses, there is not much focus on kingdoms or civilizations or wars or national borders. If conventional history focuses on human civilization with humankind at the center, Big History focuses on the universe and shows how humankind fits within this framework and places human history in the wider context of the universe's history.

Unlike conventional history, Big History tends to go rapidly through detailed historical eras such as the Renaissance or Ancient Egypt. It draws on the latest findings from biology, astronomy, geoscience, chemistry, physics, archaeology, anthropology, psychology, sociology, economics, prehistory, ancient history, and natural history, as well as standard history. One teacher explained:

We're taking the best evidence from physics and the best evidence from chemistry and biology, and we're weaving it together into a story ... They're not going to learn how to balance [chemical] equations, but they're going to learn how the chemical elements came out of the death of stars, and that's really interesting.

Big History arose from a desire to go beyond the specialized and self-contained fields that emerged in the 20th century. It tries to grasp history as a whole, looking for common themes across multiple time scales in history. Conventional history typically begins with the invention of writing, and is limited to past events relating directly to the human race. Big Historians point out that this limits study to the past 5,000 years and neglects the much longer time when humans existed on Earth. Henry Kannberg sees Big History as being a product of the Information Age, a stage in history itself following speech, writing, and printing. Big History covers the formation of the universe, stars, and galaxies, and includes the beginning of life as well as the period of several hundred thousand years when humans were hunter-gatherers. It sees the transition to civilization as a gradual one, with many causes and effects, rather than an abrupt transformation from uncivilized static cavemen to dynamic civilized farmers. An account in The Boston Globe describes what it polemically asserts to be the conventional "history" view:

Early humans were slump-shouldered, slope-browed, hairy brutes. They hunkered over campfires and ate scorched meat. Sometimes they carried spears. Once in a while they scratched pictures of antelopes on the walls of their caves. That's what I learned during elementary school, anyway. History didn't start with the first humans—they were cavemen! The Stone Age wasn't history; the Stone Age was a preamble to history, a dystopian era of stasis before the happy onset of civilization, and the arrival of nifty developments like chariot wheels, gunpowder, and Google. History started with agriculture, nation-states, and written documents. History began in Mesopotamia's Fertile Crescent, somewhere around 4000 BC. It began when we finally overcame our savage legacy, and culture surpassed biology.

Big History, in contrast to conventional history, has more of an interdisciplinary basis. Advocates sometimes view conventional history as "microhistory" or "shallow history", and note that three-quarters of historians specialize in understanding the last 250 years while ignoring the "long march of human existence." However, one historian disputed that the discipline of history has overlooked the big view, and described the "grand narrative" of Big History as a "cliché that gets thrown around a lot." One account suggested that conventional history had the "sense of grinding the nuts into an ever finer powder." It emphasizes long-term trends and processes rather than history-making individuals or events. Historian Dipesh Chakrabarty of the University of Chicago suggested that Big History was less politicized than contemporary history because it enables people to "take a step back." It uses more kinds of evidence than the standard historical written records, such as fossils, tools, household items, pictures, structures, ecological changes and genetic variations.

Criticism of Big History
Critics of Big History, including sociologist Frank Furedi, have deemed the discipline an "anti-humanist turn of history." The Big History narrative has also been challenged for failing to engage with the methodology of the conventional history discipline. According to historian and educator Sam Wineburg of Stanford University, Big History eschews the interpretation of texts in favor of a purely scientific approach, thus becoming "less history and more of a kind of evolutionary biology or quantum physics." Others have pointed out that such criticisms of Big History removing the human element or not following a historical methodology seem to derive from observers who have not sufficiently looked into what Big History actually does, with most courses having one-third or half devoted to humanity, with the concept of increasing complexity giving humanity an important place, and with methods in the natural sciences being innately historical since they also attempt to gather evidence in order to craft a narrative.
Currently, the Big History is a consolidated academic field that is giving rise to new views and epistemological approaches, especially in Latin America and the Caribbean, whose decolonial vision of history, economics and Science has opened new questions. In this sense, the transdisciplinary and biomimetics research of Javier Collado represents an ecology of knowledge between scientific knowledge and the ancestral wisdom of native peoples, such as Indigenous peoples in Ecuador. This transdisciplinary vision integrates and unifies diverse epistemes that are in, between, and beyond the scientific disciplines, that is, it includes ancestral wisdom, spirituality, art, emotions, mystical experiences and other dimensions forgotten in the history of science, specially by the positivist approach. In approaching the Big History from the complexity sciences, the transdisciplinary methodology seeks to understand the interconnections of the human race with the different levels of reality that co-exist in nature and in the cosmos , and this includes mystical and spiritual experiences, very present in the rituals of shamanism with ayahuasca and other sacred plants. The common denominator of all indigenous and aboriginal ancestral worldviews is the spiritual and ecological conception that structures their social organizations, which are in harmony and respect with the different forms of life that exist on our planet.  In the same way that Fritjof Capra carried out an analysis of the parallels between modern physics and Eastern mysticism, the teaching of the Big History in universities of Brazil, Ecuador, Colombia, and Argentina is nourished by the worldview of their ancestor to analyze the parallels between the scientific discoveries and the original knowledge of the native and indigenous peoples.

Another criticism of Big History made by associate professor Ian Hesketh, is that it mixes up science disciplines using holistic views that is very close to mythic or religious approaches, without mentioning this in its narrative.

Themes

Big History seeks to retell the "human story" in light of scientific advances by such methods as radiocarbon dating, genetic analysis, thermodynamic measurements of "free energy rate density", along with a host of methods employed in archaeology, anthropology, and world history. David Christian of Macquarie University has argued that the recent past is only understandable in terms of the "whole 14-billion-year span of time itself." David Baker of Macquarie University has pointed out that not only do the physical principles of energy flows and complexity connect human history to the very start of the Universe, but the broadest view of human history many also supply the discipline of history with a "unifying theme" in the form of the concept of collective learning. Big History also explores the mix of individual action and social and environmental forces, according to one view. Big History seeks to discover repeating patterns during the 13.8 billion years since the Big Bang and explore the core transdisciplinary theme of increasing complexity as described by Eric Chaisson of Harvard University.

Time scales and questions
Big History makes comparisons based on different time scales and notes similarities and differences between the human, geological, and cosmological scales. David Christian believes such "radical shifts in perspective" will yield "new insights into familiar historical problems, from the nature/nurture debate to environmental history to the fundamental nature of change itself." It shows how human existence has been changed by both human-made and natural factors: for example, according to natural processes which happened more than four billion years ago, iron emerged from the remains of an exploding star and, as a result, humans could use this hard metal to forge weapons for hunting and war. The discipline addresses such questions as "How did we get here?," "How do we decide what to believe?," "How did Earth form?," and "What is life?" According to Fred Spier it offers a "grand tour of all the major scientific paradigms" and helps students to become scientifically literate quickly. One interesting perspective that arises from Big History is that despite the vast temporal and spatial scales of the history of the Universe, it is actually very small pockets of the cosmos where most of the "history" is happening, due to the nature of complexity.

Cosmic evolution

Cosmic evolution, the scientific study of universal change, is closely related to Big History (as are the allied subjects of the epic of evolution and astrobiology); some researchers regard cosmic evolution as broader than Big History, since the latter mainly  examines the specific historical trek from Big Bang → Milky Way → Sun → Earth → humanity. Cosmic evolution, while fully addressing all complex systems (and not merely those that led to humans) has been taught and researched for decades, mostly by astronomers and astrophysicists. This Big-Bang-to-humankind scenario well preceded the subject that some historians began calling Big History in the 1990s. Cosmic evolution is an intellectual framework that offers a grand synthesis of the many varied changes in the assembly and composition of radiation, matter, and life throughout the history of the universe. While engaging in issues of the origins of humanity, this interdisciplinary subject attempts to unify the sciences within the entirety of natural history—a single, inclusive scientific narrative of the origin and evolution of all material things over ~14 billion years, from the origin of the universe to the present day on Earth.

The roots of the idea of cosmic evolution extend back millennia. Ancient Greek philosophers in the fifth century BCE, most notably Heraclitus, are celebrated for their reasoned claims that all things change. Early modern speculation about cosmic evolution began more than a century ago, including the broad insights of Robert Chambers, Herbert Spencer, Charles Sanders Peirce, and Lawrence Henderson. Only in the mid-20th century was the cosmic-evolutionary scenario articulated as a research paradigm to include empirical studies of galaxies, stars, planets, and life—in short, an expansive agenda that combines physical, biological, and cultural evolution. Harlow Shapley widely articulated the idea of cosmic evolution (often calling it "cosmography") in public venues at mid-century, and NASA embraced it in the late 20th century as part of its more limited astrobiology program. Carl Sagan, Eric Chaisson, Hubert Reeves, Erich Jantsch, and Preston Cloud, among others, extensively championed cosmic evolution at roughly the same time around 1980. This extremely broad subject now continues to be formulated as both a technical research program and a scientific worldview for the 21st century.

One popular collection of scholarly materials on cosmic evolution is based on teaching and research that has been underway at Harvard University since the mid-1970s.

Complexity, energy, thresholds
Cosmic evolution is a quantitative subject, whereas big history typically is not; this is because cosmic evolution is practiced mostly by natural scientists, while big history by social scholars. These two subjects, closely allied and overlapping, benefit from each other; cosmic evolutionists tend to treat universal history linearly, thus humankind enters their story only at the most very recent times, whereas big historians tend to stress humanity and its many cultural achievements, granting human beings a larger part of their story. One can compare and contrast these different emphases by watching two short movies portraying the Big-Bang-to-humankind narrative, one animating time linearly, and the other  capturing time (actually look-back time) logarithmically; in the former, humans enter this 14-minute movie in the last second, while in the latter we appear much earlier—yet both are correct.

These different treatments of time over ~14 billion years, each with different emphases on historical content, are further clarified by noting that some cosmic evolutionists divide the whole narrative into three phases and seven epochs:
Phases: physical evolution → biological evolution → cultural evolution
Epochs: particulate → galactic → stellar → planetary → chemical → biological → cultural
This contrasts with the approach used by some big historians who divide the narrative into many more thresholds, as noted in the discussion at the end of this section below. Yet another telling of the Big-Bang-to-humankind story is one that emphasizes the earlier universe, particularly the growth of particles, galaxies, and large-scale cosmic structure, such as in physical cosmology.

Notable among quantitative efforts to describe cosmic evolution are Eric Chaisson's research efforts to describe the concept of energy flow through open, thermodynamic systems, including galaxies, stars, planets, life, and society. The observed increase of energy rate density (energy/time/mass) among a whole host of complex systems is one useful way to explain the rise of complexity in an expanding universe that still obeys the cherished second law of thermodynamics and thus continues to accumulate net entropy. As such, ordered material systems—from buzzing bees and redwood trees to shining stars and thinking beings—are viewed as temporary, local islands of order in a vast, global sea of disorder. A recent review article, which is especially directed toward big historians, summarizes much of this empirical effort over the past decade.

One striking finding of such complexity studies is the apparently ranked order among all known material systems in the universe. Although the absolute energy in astronomical systems greatly exceeds that of humans, and although the mass densities of stars, planets, bodies, and brains are all comparable, the energy rate density for humans and modern human society are approximately a million times greater than for stars and galaxies. For example, the Sun emits a vast luminosity, 4x1033 erg/s (equivalent to nearly a billion billion billion watt light bulb), but it also has a huge mass, 2x1033 g; thus each second an amount of energy equaling only 2 ergs passes through each gram of this star. In contrast to any star, more energy flows through each gram of a plant's leaf during photosynthesis, and much more (nearly a million times) rushes through each gram of a human brain while thinking (~20W/1350g).

Cosmic evolution is more than a subjective, qualitative assertion of "one damn thing after another". This inclusive scientific worldview constitutes an objective, quantitative approach toward deciphering much of what comprises organized, material Nature. Its uniform, consistent philosophy of approach toward all complex systems demonstrates that the basic differences, both within and among many varied systems, are of degree, not of kind. And, in particular, it suggests that optimal ranges of energy rate density grant opportunities for the evolution of complexity; those systems able to adjust, adapt, or otherwise take advantage of such energy flows survive and prosper, while other systems adversely affected by too much or too little energy are non-randomly eliminated.

Fred Spier is foremost among those big historians who have found the concept of energy flows useful, suggesting that Big History is the rise and demise of complexity on all scales, from sub-microscopic particles to vast galaxy clusters, and not least many biological and cultural systems in between.

David Christian, in an 18-minute TED talk, described some of the basics of the Big History course. Christian describes each stage in the progression towards greater complexity as a "threshold moment" when things become more complex, but they also become more fragile and mobile. Some of Christian's threshold stages are:

 The universe appears, incredibly hot, busting, expanding, within a second.
 Stars are born.
 Stars die, creating temperatures hot enough to make complex chemicals, as well as rocks, asteroids, planets, moons, and our solar system.
 Earth is created.
 Life appears on Earth, with molecules growing from the Goldilocks conditions, with neither too much nor too little energy.
 Humans appear, language, collective learning.

Christian elaborated that more complex systems are more fragile, and that while collective learning is a powerful force to advance humanity in general, it is not clear that humans are in charge of it, and it is possible in his view for humans to destroy the biosphere with the powerful weapons that have been invented.

In the 2008 lecture series through The Teaching Company's Great Courses entitled Big History: The Big Bang, Life on Earth, and the Rise of Humanity, Christian explains Big History in terms of eight thresholds of increasing complexity:

 The Big Bang and the creation of the Universe about roughly 14 billion years ago
 The creation of the first complex objects, stars, about 12 billion years ago
 The creation of chemical elements inside dying stars required for chemically complex objects, including plants and animals
 The formation of planets, such as our Earth, which are more chemically complex than the Sun
 The origin and evolution of life from roughly about 4.2 billion years ago, including the evolution of our hominine ancestors
 The development of our species, Homo sapiens, about 300,000 years ago, covering the Paleolithic era of human history
 The appearance of agriculture about 11,000 years ago in the Neolithic era, allowing for larger, more complex societies
 The "modern revolution", or the vast social, economic, and cultural transformations that brought the world into the modern era
 What will happen in the future and predicting what will be the next threshold in our history

Goldilocks conditions

A theme in Big History is what has been termed Goldilocks conditions or the Goldilocks principle, which describes how "circumstances must be right for any type of complexity to form or continue to exist," as emphasized by Spier in his recent book. For humans, bodily temperatures can neither be too hot nor too cold; for life to form on a planet, it can neither have too much nor too little energy from sunlight. Stars require sufficient quantities of hydrogen, sufficiently packed together under tremendous gravity, to cause nuclear fusion.

Christian suggests that complexity arises when these Goldilocks conditions are met, that is, when things are not too hot or cold, not too fast or slow. For example, life began not in solids (molecules are stuck together, preventing the right kinds of associations) or gases (molecules move too fast to enable favorable associations) but in liquids such as water that permitted the right kinds of interactions at the right speeds.

Somewhat in contrast, Chaisson has maintained for well more than a decade that "organizational complexity is mostly governed by the optimum use of energy—not too little as to starve a system, yet not too much as to destroy it".  Neither maximum energy principles nor minimum entropy states are likely relevant to appreciate the emergence of complexity in Nature writ large.

Other themes

Advances in particular sciences such as archaeology, gene mapping, and evolutionary ecology have enabled historians to gain new insights into the early origins of humans, despite the lack of written sources. One account suggested that proponents of Big History were trying to "upend" the conventional practice in historiography of relying on written records.

Big History proponents suggest that humans have been affecting climate change throughout history, by such methods as slash-and-burn agriculture, although past modifications have been on a lesser scale than in recent years during the Industrial Revolution.

A book by Daniel Lord Smail in 2008 suggested that history was a continuing process of humans learning to self-modify our mental states by using stimulants such as coffee and tobacco, as well as other means such as religious rites or romance novels. His view is that culture and biology are highly intertwined, such that cultural practices may cause human brains to be wired differently from those in different societies.

Another theme that has been actively discussed recently by the Big History community is the issue of the Big History Singularity.

A 2021 book, Expanding Worldviews: Astrobiology, Big History and Cosmic Perspectives, edited by Ian Crawford explores links between Big History and astrobiology, and argues that both subjects have the potential to yield positive intellectual and societal benefits owing to their inherent cosmic and evolutionary perspectives.

Presentation by web-based interactive video
Big History is more likely than conventional history to be taught with interactive "video-heavy" websites without textbooks, according to one account. The discipline has benefited from having new ways of presenting themes and concepts in new formats, often supplemented by Internet and computer technology. For example, the ChronoZoom project is a way to explore the 14 billion year history of the universe in an interactive website format. It was described in one account:

In 2012, the History channel showed the film History of the World in Two Hours. It showed how dinosaurs effectively dominated mammals for 160 million years until an asteroid impact wiped them out. One report suggested the History channel had won a sponsorship from StanChart to develop a Big History program entitled Mankind. In 2013 the History channel's new H2 network debuted the 10-part series Big History, narrated by Bryan Cranston and featuring David Christian and an assortment of historians, scientists and related experts. Each episode centered on a major Big History topic such as salt, mountains, cold, flight, water, meteors and megastructures.

History of the field

Early efforts

While the emerging field of Big History in its present state is generally seen as having emerged in the past two decades beginning around 1990, there have been numerous precedents going back almost 150 years. In the mid-19th century, Alexander von Humboldt's book Cosmos, and Robert Chambers' 1844 book Vestiges of the Natural History of Creation were seen as early precursors to the field. In a sense, Darwin's theory of evolution was, in itself, an attempt to explain a biological phenomenon by examining longer term cause-and-effect processes. In the first half of the 20th century, secular biologist Julian Huxley originated the term "evolutionary humanism", while around the same time the French Jesuit paleontologist Pierre Teilhard de Chardin examined links between cosmic evolution and a tendency towards complexification (including human consciousness), while envisaging compatibility between cosmology, evolution, and theology. In the mid and later 20th century, The Ascent of Man by Jacob Bronowski examined history from a multidisciplinary perspective. Later, Eric Chaisson explored the subject of cosmic evolution quantitatively in terms of energy rate density, and the astronomer Carl Sagan wrote Cosmos. Thomas Berry, a cultural historian, and the academic Brian Swimme explored meaning behind myths and encouraged academics to explore themes beyond organized religion.

The field continued to evolve from interdisciplinary studies during the mid-20th century, stimulated in part by the Cold War and the Space Race. Some early efforts were courses in Cosmic Evolution at Harvard University in the United States, and Universal History in the Soviet Union. One account suggested that the notable Earthrise photo, taken by William Anders during a lunar orbit by the Apollo 8, which showed Earth as a small blue and white ball behind a stark and desolate lunar landscape, not only stimulated the environmental movement but also caused an upsurge of interdisciplinary interest. The French historian Fernand Braudel examined daily life with investigations of "large-scale historical forces like geology and climate". Physiologist Jared Diamond in his book Guns, Germs, and Steel examined the interplay between geography and human evolution; for example, he argued that the horizontal shape of the Eurasian continent enabled human civilizations to advance more quickly than the vertical north–south shape of the American continent, because an east–west continental axis and correspondingly similar climates facilitated the transfer and exchange of animals (as protein, for pulling carts, and other uses), ideas and information, as well as structures of human competition that honed and fine-tuned cultural and technological achievements.

In the 1970s, scholars in the United States including geologist Preston Cloud of the University of Minnesota, astronomer G. Siegfried Kutter at Evergreen State College in Washington state, and Harvard University astrophysicists George B. Field and Eric Chaisson started synthesizing knowledge to form a "science-based history of everything", although each of these scholars emphasized somewhat their own particular specializations in their courses and books. In 1980, the Austrian philosopher Erich Jantsch wrote The Self-Organizing Universe which viewed history in terms of what he called "process structures". There was an experimental course taught by John Mears at Southern Methodist University in Dallas, Texas, and more formal courses at the university level began to appear.

In 1991 Clive Ponting wrote A Green History of the World: The Environment and the Collapse of Great Civilizations. His analysis did not begin with the Big Bang, but his chapter "Foundations of History" explored the influences of large-scale geological and astronomical forces over a broad time period.

Sometimes the terms "Deep History" and "Big History" are interchangeable, but sometimes "Deep History" simply refers to history going back several hundred thousand years or more without the other senses of being a movement within history itself.

David Christian
One exponent is David Christian of Macquarie University in Sydney, Australia. He read widely in diverse fields in science, and believed that much was missing from the general study of history. His first university-level course was offered in 1989. He developed a college course beginning with the Big Bang to the present in which he collaborated with numerous colleagues from diverse fields in science and the humanities and the social sciences. This course eventually became a Teaching Company course entitled Big History: The Big Bang, Life on Earth, and the Rise of Humanity, with 24 hours of lectures, which appeared in 2008.

Since the 1990s, other universities began to offer similar courses. In 1994 at the University of Amsterdam and the Eindhoven University of Technology, college courses were offered. In 1996, Fred Spier wrote The Structure of Big History. Spier looked at structured processes which he termed "regimes":

Christian's course caught the attention of philanthropist Bill Gates, who discussed with him how to turn Big History into a high school-level course. Gates said about David Christian:

Educational courses
By 2002, a dozen college courses on Big History had sprung up around the world. Cynthia Stokes Brown initiated Big History at the Dominican University of California, and she wrote Big History: From the Big Bang to the Present. In 2010, Dominican University of California launched the world's first Big History program to be required of all first-year students, as part of the school's general education track. This program, directed by Mojgan Behmand, includes a one-semester survey of Big History, and an interdisciplinary second-semester course exploring the Big History metanarrative through the lens of a particular discipline or subject. A course description reads:

The Dominican faculty's approach is to synthesize the disparate threads of Big History thought, in order to teach the content, develop critical thinking and writing skills, and prepare students to wrestle with the philosophical implications of the Big History metanarrative. In 2015, University of California Press published Teaching Big History, a comprehensive pedagogical guide for teaching Big History, edited by Richard B. Simon, Mojgan Behmand, and Thomas Burke, and written by the Dominican faculty.

Barry Rodrigue, at the University of Southern Maine, established the first general education course and the first online version, which has drawn students from around the world. The University of Queensland in Australia offers an undergraduate course entitled Global History, required for all history majors, which "surveys how powerful forces and factors at work on large time-scales have shaped human history". By 2011, 50 professors around the world have offered courses. In 2012, one report suggested that Big History was being practiced as a "coherent form of research and teaching" by hundreds of academics from different disciplines.

There are efforts to bring Big History to younger students. In 2008, Christian and his colleagues began developing a course for secondary school students. In 2011, a pilot high school course was taught to 3,000 kids in 50 high schools worldwide. In 2012, there were 87 schools, with 50 in the United States, teaching Big History, with the pilot program set to double in 2013 for students in the ninth and tenth grades, and even in one middle school. The subject is a STEM course at one high school.

There are initiatives to make Big History a required standard course for university students throughout the world. An education project founded by philanthropist Bill Gates from his personal funds was launched in Australia and the United States, to offer a free online version of the course to high school students.

International Big History Association

The International Big History Association (IBHA) was founded at the Coldigioco Geological Observatory in Coldigioco, Marche, Italy, on 20 August 2010. Its headquarters is located at Grand Valley State University in Allendale, Michigan, United States. Its inaugural gathering in 2012 was described as "big news" in a report in The Huffington Post. 
The Second IBHA Conference took place in Dominican University of California (San Rafael, CA) on August 6–10, 2014.  The Third IBHA Conference was held in University of Amsterdam on 14-17 July 2016.

People involved
Some notable academics involved with the concept include:

 David Christian of Macquarie University, Sydney, Australia

 Eric Chaisson of Harvard University, Cambridge, Massachusetts
 Walter Alvarez of the University of California, Berkeley, California
 Craig Benjamin of Grand Valley State University, Allendale, Michigan
 Cynthia Stokes Brown of Dominican University of California, San Rafael, California
 Andrey Korotayev of the Center for Big History and System Forecasting of the Institute of Oriental Studies of the Russian Academy of Sciences, Moscow, Russia

 Graeme Snooks of the Australian National University and the Institute of Global Dynamic Systems, Canberra, Australia.

 Ian Crawford of Birkbeck College London, UK

See also

 Annales school
 Deep time
 Deep Time History
 Encyclopedia of Life
 Hierarchy theory
 Integrative level
 Macrohistory
 Scale (analytical tool)
 Transdisciplinarity

References

External links
 ChronoZoom website
 Teaching & Researching Big History: Exploring a New Scholarly Field, International Big History Association, 2014.
 Cosmic evolution website, a multi-media web site with many video/animation interactive features for both introductory learners and technical experts
 Official website for the International Big History Association
 Big History Site website, multilingual
 Co-evolution in Big History – a transdisciplinary and biomimetic introduction to the Sustainable Development Goals.